This article serves as an index - as complete as possible - of all the honorific orders or similar decorations received by the Liechtenstein Princely Family, classified by continent, awarding country and recipient.

Liechtenstein
 Prince Hans-Adam II:
 Sovereign of the Order of Merit of the Principality of Liechtenstein, Grand Star.
 Sovereign Recipient of the 70th Birthday Medal of Prince Franz Joseph II.
 Prince Alois: Grand Star of the Order of Merit of the Principality of Liechtenstein.
 Princess Sophie: Grand Star of the Order of Merit of the Principality of Liechtenstein.
 Prince Philipp:
 Grand Star of the Order of Merit of the Principality of Liechtenstein, 1st Class.
 Recipient of the 70th Birthday Medal of Prince Franz Joseph II. 
 Prince Nikolaus:
 Grand Star of the Order of Merit of the Principality of Liechtenstein, 1st Class.
 Recipient of the 70th Birthday Medal of Prince Franz Joseph II.
 Princess Margaretha: Grand Star of the Order of Merit of the Principality of Liechtenstein.
 Princess Nora: Recipient of the 70th Birthday Medal of Prince Franz Joseph II.

Foreign states

Austria
 Prince Hans-Adam II: Grand Cross of the Decoration of Honour for Services to the Republic of Austria, Grand Star.

 Prince Alois: Grand Decoration of Honour in Gold with Sash for Services to the Republic of Austria.
 Princess Sophie: Grand Decoration of Honour in Gold with Sash for Services to the Republic of Austria.
 Prince Nikolaus: Grand Cross of the Decoration of Honour for Services to the Republic of Austria, Silver.

Holy See
 Prince Nikolaus: Knight Grand Cross of the Order of Pope Pius IX.

Luxembourg
 Prince Nikolaus: 
 Knight Grand Cross of the Order of Adolphe of Nassau.
 Recipient of the Grand Duke Jean Silver Jubilee Medal.
 Princess Margaretha:
 Knight Grand Cross of the Order of Adolphe of Nassau.
 Recipient of the Grand Duke Jean Silver Jubilee Medal.

Netherlands 

 Prince Alois: Recipient of the King Willem-Alexander Inauguration Medal. 
 Princess Sophie: Recipient of the King Willem-Alexander Inauguration Medal.

Sovereign Military Order of Malta
 Prince Alois: Grand Cross pro Merito Melitensi – civilian special class –.
 Prince Philipp: Knight of Honour and Devotion of the Sovereign Military Order of Malta.
 Prince Nikolaus: Knight of Honour and Devotion of the Sovereign Military Order of Malta.
 Princess Margaretha: Dame Grand Cross of Honour and Devotion of the Sovereign Military Order of Malta.
 Prince Heinrich (grandson of Prince Karl): Knight of Honour and Devotion of the Sovereign Military Order of Malta.
 Prince Andreas: Knight Grand Cross of Honour and Devotion of the Sovereign Military Order of Malta.

Spain
 Princess Margaretha: Dame Grand Cross of the Order of Isabella the Catholic.

Sweden

 Prince Alois: Recipient of the 70th Birthday Badge Medal of King Carl XVI Gustaf.
 Princess Sophie: Recipient of the 70th Birthday Badge Medal of King Carl XVI Gustaf.

Formerly reigning families

Austrian-Hungarian Imperial and Royal family 
 Prince Hans-Adam II: 1,305th Knight with Collar of the Order of the Golden Fleece
 Prince Michael (son of Prince Heinrich): Knight of the Order of the Golden Fleece

Bavarian Royal Family
 Prince Hans-Adam II: Knight Grand Cross of the Order of Saint Hubert.
 Princess Sophie:
 Dame of Honour of the Order of Theresa.
 Dame of the Order of Saint Elizabeth.

Portuguese Royal Family 
 Princess Margaretha: Dame Grand Cross of the Order of Queen Saint Isabel.

References 

Orders, decorations, and medals of Liechtenstein
Liechtenstein